WKEU-FM 88.9 is an FM radio station broadcasting a classic hits format.  Its city of license is The Rock, Georgia, United States.  The station is owned by Georgia Public Radio, Inc. (no relation to Georgia Public Broadcasting's GPB Radio), and also features radio programming from ABC Radio.  Having an original airdate in 1999, it is the sister station of WKEU AM 1450, in nearby Griffin, Georgia.  The broadcast callsign was previously on 97.5 in Fayetteville, Georgia, also nearby.

WKEU-FM is highly unusual in that the vast majority of noncommercial educational stations in the U.S. are either college radio, Christian radio, public radio, or one of a few indie radio stations.  In contrast, this station does not appear to be supported by any such group, nor does it engage in any on-air underwriting, pledge drives, or any other fundraising activities, nor any self-promotion of its own programming or of the organization that operates it.  It also has almost no talking between songs, and no radio DJs, instead seeming to be run by broadcast automation.  Classic rock is also nearly unheard-of on a noncommercial station, instead being more likely on commercial radio, which Atlanta already has one of on full-power WNNX FM.

References

External links

KEU-FM
Classic hits radio stations in the United States